Lee Kan-hee (born February 3, 1969) is a South Korean actress.

Filmography

Film

Television series

Awards and nominations

References

External links
 
 
 
 

1969 births
Living people
South Korean television actresses
South Korean film actresses
20th-century South Korean actresses
21st-century South Korean actresses